Chewara is a Block/village in Sheikhpura district of Bihar.

References

Villages in Sheikhpura district